Sparkler may refer to:

 Sparkler, a type of pyrotechnic device
 Sparkler (comics), a fictional character in the DC Universe
 Sparkler, a ride at Holiday World & Splashin' Safari
 Sparkler (Pillow Pal), a plush bear made by Ty, Inc.
 Sparkler (device), a showerhead-like device used in beer dispensing
 Sparkler, a 1997 film directed and co-written by Darren Stein
 Sparklers, a budget software reissue label associated with Creative Sparks
 Sparkler, a distant galaxy gravitationally lensed by galaxy cluster SMACS J0723.3–7327
 A variety of mixed drinks using club soda as a base (often similar to a "Fizz")

See also
 Spark (disambiguation)
 Sparkling (disambiguation)